Choutuppal is a census town in Yadadri Bhuvanagiri district of the Indian state of Telangana. It is located in Choutuppal mandal of Choutuppal division. Its part of Hyderabad Metropolitan Development Authority.

Demographics
 India census, Choutuppal is a Census Town city in district of Yadadri-Bhuvanagiri, Telangana. The Choutuppal Census Town has population of 19,092 of which 9,588 are males while 9,504 are females as per report released by Census India 2011.

Population of Children with age of 0-6 is 2410 which is 12.62% of total population of Choutuppal (CT). In Choutuppal Census Town, Female Sex Ratio is of 991 against state average of 993. Moreover, Child Sex Ratio in Choutuppal is around 942 compared to Telangana state average of 939. Literacy rate of Choutuppal city is 82.41% higher than state average of 67.02%. In Choutuppal, Male literacy is around 88.85% while female literacy rate is 75.97%.

Choutuppal Census Town has total administration over 4,565 houses to which it supplies basic amenities like water and sewerage. It is also authorized to build roads within Census Town limits and impose taxes on properties coming under its jurisdiction.

Nearby mandals of Choutuppal are Samsthan Narayanapur, Bhoodan Pochampally, Valigonda, Chityala, Munugode.

Villages

Politics 
Bhuvanagiri as a Lok Sabha constituency came into existence in 2008 as per Delimitation Act of 2002.
Komatireddy Venkat Reddy is the present MP
Kusukuntla prabhakar Reddy is the present MLA(2022 BY ELECTIONS)
Venreddy Raju is the present choutuppal municipal chairman chairman of choutuppal municipality
url=https://choutuppalmunicipality.telangana.gov.in/</ref>

Nearest cities 
Hyderabad - 50 km
Pedda Amberpet ORR - 30 km
Bhongir - 34 km
Nalgonda - 52 km
Suryapet - 88 km

Transport 
 Nearest Bus station: Choutuppal - 5 Km
 Nearest Railway Division(All Trains): Secunderabad Code:SC - 56Km
 Nearest Airport: RGIA Hyderabad(Shamshabad) - 65Km

References 

Mandal headquarters in Yadadri Bhuvanagiri district